L'Anse-au-Clair is a town in the Labrador portion of Newfoundland and Labrador, Canada. The town has a population of 219 in the 2021 census, up from 192 in 2011.

It was established by the French in the early 18th century. People began to settle in the L'Anse-au-Clair area after the Quebec–Labrador border dispute was settled in 1825.

The settlement of  L'Anse au Cotard an area near the town is attributed to Jersey fishermen and merchants coming to the region with the earliest known permanent resident being James Dumaresq from the Dumaresq family who decided to build a home in the region around 1810. Descendants of Dumaresq and other Jersey families still inhabit the region and Canada as a whole.

Demographics 

References

External links 

L'anse au Clair
L'Anse-au-Clair - Encyclopedia of Newfoundland and Labrador, vol. 3, p. 245.

Towns in Newfoundland and Labrador
Populated places in Labrador